Denare Beach is a northern village on the east shore of Amisk Lake, Saskatchewan.

History 
The area originally settled around Amisk Lake was called "Beaver Lake". Amisk is Cree for Beaver and thus the origin of the name. In 1937, the subdivision of the present community of Denare Beach took place. The community quickly became a resort area following the construction of a roadway to the mining centre of Flin Flon. When Saskatchewan Parks became responsible for the area they changed the name from Amisk or Beaver to Denare Beach. Taking the first two letters from Department of Natural Resources they arrived at the name of Denare Beach. The community has managed to retain its resort atmosphere.

Demographics 

Demographics 
In the 2011 Census, Denare Beach had a population of 820 living in 310 of its 449 total private dwellings.

Economy 
The area is rich in heritage of the Native Canadian culture, the fur trade, European exploration and mineral prospecting. The landscape and lake frontage have attracted human activity for many centuries. An old portage along the "Mill Stream" has from time immemorial provided a transportation link between Amisk Lake and Mosher Lake. Archaeological discoveries indicate that this route was popular with the Indian and fur trading travelers. Many pictographs can be seen in the southern part of the lake to this day. Swampy and Woods Cree are the prevalent Aboriginal cultures which thrive in this beautiful area. A trading post and small permanent settlement of white trappers and fishermen was established in the immediate vicinity in the early part of the 20th century.

Medical service 
Due to the small population of Denare Beach, the Government of Saskatchewan permits its residents in Creighton, Denare Beach, Sandy Bay, and Pelican Narrows to utilize the basic and emergency medical services of Flin Flon. One of the most frequently accessed services is the Flin Flon General Hospital, and Flin Flon Ambulance Service.

See also 
 List of communities in Northern Saskatchewan
 List of communities in Saskatchewan
 Villages of Saskatchewan

References

External links 

Division No. 18, Saskatchewan
Northern villages in Saskatchewan